Shah Yousuf Gardez was an Islamic Sufi saint who came to Multan, (present-day Punjab, Pakistan) in 1088 AD. He is said to have restored the city of Multan, converted many people to the Islamic religion, and performed numerous miracles. He came from Gardez in the present-day Paktia Province of Afghanistan.

Gallery

References 

Twelvers
Shia imams
People from Multan
Punjabi Sufi saints
Multan District